Khotimlia is a village in Chuhuiv Raion of Kharkiv Oblast in southern Ukraine, about  EbN from the centre of Kharkiv city.

The settlement came under attack by Russian forces during the Russian invasion of Ukraine in 2022, and was regained by Ukrainian forces by the beginning of 2023 at the latest.

References

Villages in Chuhuiv Raion
Volchansky Uyezd